This is a list of Postsecondary educational institutions affiliated with the Church of God (Cleveland).

Christian Service School

A Christian Service School is an institution designed to offer basic Christian service training to ministers and laity. The school may function in a local church under the guidance of the pastor or one whom he appoints.

Harvest Church of God Bible School, Addis Ababa, Ethiopia 
Arabic International Theological Seminary, Vancouver, British Columbia, Canada 
Full Gospel School of Theology, Wukari, Nigeria 
London School of Ministries, Southall, Middlesex, England 
Mt. Zion School of Ministry, Saint Thomas, United States Virgin Islands

Bible Institute

A Bible Institute offers postsecondary or college-level education and training to individuals preparing for Christian ministry. The education focuses on extensive biblical
knowledge, combined with a training emphasis on practical application. The institute functions under the auspices of the denomination upon recommendation of the Division of Education.

Church of God School of Ministry, Cleveland, Tennessee 
Bethel Bible College, Lusaka, Zambia 
Bible Training Center Dar es Salaam, Dar es Salaam, Tanzania 
Centro de Formación Ministerial, Limón, Costa Rica 
International Bible Institute, Roadtown, Tortola, British Virgin Islands 
Latvian School of Christian Ministries, Jelgava, Latvia 
Leadership Training Center, Northampton, England 
Scuola Biblica Italiana, (European Theological Seminary extension), Palermo, Italy 
Seminario Bíblico Pentecostal - Central, Quetzaltenango, Guatemala 
Instituto Teológico FIDE, Madrid, Spain

Degree-Granting Institution

A degree-granting institution is one which offers college-level programs of study leading to a baccalaureate degree or its equivalent. This normally requires 120 semester credits
with a general education core and a major area of study or its equivalent in the context of each respective institution.

Full Gospel Church of God College, Irene, South Africa
Faculdad Argentina de Estudios Teológicos, Buenos Aires, Argentina
Eurasian Theological Seminary(ETSM), Moscow, Russia
Discipleship College, Eldoret, Kenya
Northern Luzon Theological College and Seminary – Isabela Campus, Isabela, Philippines
Indian Theological Seminary, Chengannur, India
Bulgarian Theological College, Stara Zagora, Bulgaria
Bethel Bible College, Mandeville, Jamaica
Barbados Bible College, Bridgetown, Barbados
Full Gospel School of Theology, Abak, Nigeria
Instituto Biblico Panameño, Panama City, Panama
Mahanaim Bible College, Mumbai, India
Mount Zion Bible College(Hosting master's degree program from ASCM, Manila, Philippines), Chengannur, India
Pan African Christian University College, Winnaba, Ghana
Seminaire Theologique de L’Eglise de Dieu en Haiti(STEDH)(Hosting master's degree program from Pentecostal Theological Seminary), Port-au-Prince, Haïti
Seminario Bíblico Pentecostal de Centroamérica(SEBIPCA)(Hosting master's degree program from Lee University), Quetzaltenango, Guatemala
Seminario Bíblico Ministerial Argentina(SEBIMA), Buenos Aires, Argentina
Seminario Bíblico Teológico de la Iglesia de Dios(SEBID), Santo Domingo, Dominican Republic
Seminario Teológico Ministerial, Santiago, Chile
Tamil Nadu Bible College, Tamil Nadu, India

Graduate Degree-Granting Institution

A graduate degree-granting Institution is a college, seminary, or university, offering postgraduate degrees. Level IV certification is available only to those institutions which
independently grant said degrees. If an institution hosts a graduate program from another institution, this alone does not meet the criteria for a Level IV certification.
When an institution offers a master's degree program, it may be certified only when 100 percent of the resident faculty members teaching at the master's level have appropriate
academic credentials.

Lee University, Cleveland, Tennessee
Pentecostal Theological Seminary(ETS), Cleveland, Tennessee
European Theological Seminary, Kniebis, Germany
Asian Seminary of Christian Ministries, Manila, Philippines
Bethel Theological Seminary, Jakarta, Indonesia
Gilgal Biblical Seminary, Sharjah, Dubai, United Arab Emirates
L.E.E. Community College, Singapore
Pentecostal Theological Institute, Bucharest, Romania
Seminario Bíblico Mexicano(SEBIME), Hermosillo, Mexico
Seminario Evangélico da Igreja de Deus(SEID), Goiana, Brazil
Seminario Ministerial Sudamericano(SEMISUD), Quito, Ecuador
Universidad Teológica del Caribe(UTC), St. Just, Puerto Rico

External links
Church of God International Board of Education
Official web site of the Church of God

References

Universities and colleges affiliated with the Church of God (Cleveland, Tennessee)
Church of God